"Live with Me" is a song by Massive Attack which was included in their 2006 compilation album, Collected, and was also released as a single. The song is notable for the critical acclaim it garnered due to its haunting lyrics, soulful vocals, and emotional string section.

Vocals
Vocals were supplied by the acclaimed soul singer Terry Callier, who was 60 at the time the song was recorded. Callier was an American jazz, soul and folk guitarist singer-songwriter from Chicago, Illinois, who won a UN Peace Award for his humanitarian work promoting peace through his songs.

Critical reception
MusicOMH described the song as "not only a welcome return for the band but a hark back to their glory days, circa Blue Lines and Protection; it is an aching, haunting love song ... that beautifully evokes the pain and longing of failed romance. ... Callier's gloriously emotive vocal that lifts this track far above and beyond average. He succeeds in being both fragile and powerful in a way that previous Massive Attack vocalists Shara Nelson and Tracey Thorn also achieved."

ContractMusic said that "Live With Me" "has a certain dark and sexy groove going on. Partly it's the trade-mark lush, sensual synthetic bass sounds that do it, but mostly it's the authentic soul vocals of Terry Callier that lift this single out of ordinariness and up into the realms of unforgettable musical moments."

Virgin Media described the song as having "some extremely evocative and rich vocals come courtesy of soul legend Terry Callier, who builds 'Live With Me' to a mesmerising climax against a backdrop of lush, expansive strings and a rolling, hypnotic bassline. It's clear the band have lost none of their distinctive edge..."

Track listings
CD (VSCDX1912)
 "Live with Me"
 "Live with Me" (alternative version)
 "False Flags"
 "Live with Me" video

DVD (VSDVD1912)
 "Live with Me" video ("director's cut")
 "False Flags" video
 "Live with Me" (alternative version)

Video
The video features a young woman (played by Kirsty Shepheard) drinking heavily, to the point of excess.  The video was directed by Jonathan Glazer. One review of the video described it as follows: "It’s uncomfortable viewing, but I found it really haunting. It features a young (mid twenties) professional-looking woman drinking herself into oblivion on her own in her flat. I can’t really put my finger on what it is about it that I find so arresting, but I thought it was an incredibly powerful four minute film."
The setting of the video clip and of the off licence store featuring in it is an area that includes Caledonian Road and Walworth Road in London.

The "alternative version" video features a close shot of Terry Callier performing the song.

Cover versions 
 The song was covered by the indie rock band The Twilight Singers on A Stitch in Time EP. The vocals were shared between The Twilight Singers' Greg Dulli and guest vocalist Mark Lanegan.

Other appearances
 The song was used at the end of season one, episode three of Person of Interest.

Charts

References

2006 singles
Massive Attack songs
Music videos directed by Jonathan Glazer
2006 songs
Virgin Records singles
Songs written by Neil Davidge
Songs written by Robert Del Naja
Songs written by Terry Callier
Terry Callier songs